Jan-Are Larsen (born 18 May 1976) is a Norwegian professional golfer.

Having shown promise as an amateur golfer, Larsen earned a scholarship to play on the golf team at the University of Alabama. Upon graduating in 2002, he entered qualifying school for the European Tour as an amateur, and was successful in claiming the fifth card for the full tour. However, his debut professional season was a struggle, making only seven cuts and failing to retain his card. Since then, Larsen has progressed to the European Tour twice more via qualifying school, but has mostly played on the second-tier Challenge Tour, where he has recorded two runner-up finishes. His best season on the European Tour has been 2008, when he finished 146th in the Order of Merit.

Larsen also has two professional wins on the Scandinavian Nordic League circuit.

Professional wins (2)

Nordic Golf League wins (2)

Team appearances
Amateur
Eisenhower Trophy (representing Norway): 2000, 2002

See also
2007 Challenge Tour graduates
2007 European Tour Qualifying School graduates

References

External links

Norwegian male golfers
Alabama Crimson Tide men's golfers
European Tour golfers
Sportspeople from Viken (county)
People from Sarpsborg
1976 births
Living people